Oliver Jackson (April 28, 1933 – May 29, 1994), also known as Bops Junior, was an American jazz drummer.

Biography
Jackson was born in Detroit, Michigan, United States, where he played in the 1940s with Thad Jones, Tommy Flanagan, and Wardell Gray, and had a variety show with Eddie Locke called Bop & Locke. After working with Yusef Lateef from 1954 until 1956, he moved to New York, where he played regularly at the Metropole in 1957 and 1958. Following this he worked with Teddy Wilson, Charlie Shavers (1959–61), Buck Clayton, Benny Goodman (1962), Lionel Hampton (1962–64), Kenny Burrell, Earl Hines (1964–70 intermittently) and the JPJ Quartet with Budd Johnson. Later in life he played with Sy Oliver (1975–80), Oscar Peterson, and George Wein's Newport All-Stars. As a bandleader, Jackson led a 1961 date in Switzerland, and recorded at least five albums for Black & Blue Records between 1977 and 1984.

His brother, bassist Ali Jackson, performed with him both at the beginning and towards the end of their careers. His nephew, Ali Jackson Jr., is a jazz drummer.

Jackson died from heart failure in New York City at the age of 61.

Discography

As leader
1984: Billy's Bounce (Black & Blue)

As sideman

With Ray Alexander
Rain In June (Nerus Records, 1992) 
With Gene Ammons
Bad! Bossa Nova (Prestige, 1962)
With Ray Bryant
Ray Bryant Plays (Signature, 1959)
Little Susie (Columbia, 1960)
With Kenny Burrell
The Tender Gender (Cadet, 1966)
With Buck Clayton
One for Buck (Columbia, 1961)
With Eddie "Lockjaw" Davis
 Jaws Strikes Again (Black & Blue, 1976)
With Dexter Gordon
Dexter Gordon with Junior Mance at Montreux (Prestige, 1970)
With Johnny Hodges
Triple Play (RCA Victor, 1967)
With Major Holley and Slam Stewart
Shut Yo' Mouth! (1981)
With Illinois Jacquet
The Blues; That's Me! (Prestige, 1969)
With Etta Jones
Love Shout (Prestige, 1963)
With Paul Gonsalves
Ellingtonia Moods and Blues (RCA Victor, 1960)
With Hank Jones
I Remember You (Black & Blue, 1977)
With King Curtis
 The New Scene of King Curtis (New Jazz, 1960)
 Soul Meeting  (Prestige, 1960)
 King Curtis & Champion Jack Dupree: Blues at Montreux (Atlantic, 1973)
With Yusef Lateef
 Jazz and the Sounds of Nature (Savoy, 1957)
 Prayer to the East (Savoy, 1957)
 The Sounds of Yusef (Prestige, 1957)
 Other Sounds (New Jazz, 1957) 
 Cry! - Tender (New Jazz, 1957)
With Gildo Mahones
 I'm Shooting High (Prestige, 1963)
With Billy Mitchell
 A Little Juicy (Smash, 1963)
With Joe Newman
 Jive at Five (Swingville, 1960)
With Billy Strayhorn
 Cue for Saxophone (Felsted, 1959)
With Joe Thomas and Jay McShann
Blowin' in from K.C. (Uptown, 1983)

References
Footnotes

General references
[ Oliver Jackson] at Allmusic
The New York Times Obituary

1933 births
1994 deaths
American jazz drummers
Musicians from Detroit
20th-century American drummers
American male drummers
Jazz musicians from Michigan
20th-century American male musicians
American male jazz musicians
Black & Blue Records artists